The 2021–22 Coupe de France preliminary rounds, Bourgogne-Franche-Comté was the qualifying competition to decide which teams from the leagues of the Bourgogne-Franche-Comté region of France took part in the main competition from the seventh round.

A total of eight teams qualified from the Bourgogne-Franche-Comté preliminary rounds. In 2020–21, UF Mâconnais progressed furthest in the main competition, reaching the round of 64 before losing to FC Saint-Louis Neuweg.

Draws and fixtures

On 8 July 2021, the league declared that 408 teams entered from the region, with 324 entering at the first round stage, 58 exempt to the second round (31 from Régionale 2 and all teams from Régionale 1). 12 Championnat National 3 teams entered at the third round stage, 3 Championnat National 2 teams at the fourth round stage and the remaining 8 clubs being part of the main draw.

The first round draw was published on 9 July 2021. The second round draw was published on 24 August 2021. The third round draw was published on 31 August 2021. The fourth round draw was published on 21 September 2021. The fifth round draw was made on 5 October 2021. The sixth round draw was made on 21 October 2021.

First round
These matches were played on 20, 21 and 22 August 2021.

Second round
These matches were played on 28 and 29 August 2021.

Third round
These matches were played on 18 and 19 September 2021.

Fourth round
These matches were played on 2 and 3 October 2021.

Fifth round
These matches were played on 16 and 17 October 2021.

Sixth round
These matches were played on 30 and 31 October 2021.

References

preliminary rounds